Fabian McCarthy (born 13 May 1977 in Vryburg, North West) is a retired South African association football player.

McCarthy competed for South Africa at the 2000 Summer Olympics.

References

External links

1977 births
South African soccer players
South Africa international soccer players
Living people
Olympic soccer players of South Africa
Footballers at the 2000 Summer Olympics
Association football defenders
Bloemfontein Celtic F.C. players
Mamelodi Sundowns F.C. players
Kaizer Chiefs F.C. players
Moroka Swallows F.C. players
Cape Coloureds
Mpumalanga Black Aces F.C. players
People from Vryburg
Maritzburg United F.C. players